The leader of the Opposition in Nova Scotia is the MLA in the Nova Scotia House of Assembly who leads the political party recognized as the Official Opposition. This status generally goes to the leader of the second largest party in the Legislative Assembly. Zach Churchill, the leader of the Liberal Party of Nova Scotia, is the current leader of the opposition.

References

See also
 List of Nova Scotia opposition leaders

Nova Scotia
Politics of Nova Scotia